RedBrick Health is a health technology and services company based in Minneapolis, Minnesota. RedBrick Health is privately held and works with large, self-insured employers, progressive health plans, providers and accountable care organizations.

History
RedBrick Health was founded in 2006 by the founders and former management team members of Definity Health. At Definity Health, RedBrick Health’s founders helped create Health Reimbursement Accounts, the predecessor to Health Savings Accounts.

RedBrick Health launched its services to its first client in the fall of 2007 and published its first year-over-year health improvement and cost-savings results in early 2009.

RedBrick Health has received $45 million in venture capital funding from Highland Capital Partners, Versant Ventures, Fidelity Ventures and Kleiner Perkins Caufield & Byers.

References

Companies established in 2006
Companies based in Minneapolis
Health care companies based in Minnesota
Medical and health organizations based in Minnesota